Sveinbjörn Sveinbjörnsson (28 June 1847 – 23 February 1927) was an Icelandic composer best known for composing "Lofsöngur", the national anthem of Iceland.

Early life and education
Sveinbjörn was born in Seltjarnarnes. He was studying divinity when he met a young violinist and composer, Johan Svendsen. At the time, Svendsen had just finished his studies in Leipzig and encouraged Sveinbjörn to go and study music, either in Leipzig or Copenhagen. Sveinbjörn went to Copenhagen, but later carried on to Leipzig where his teacher was Carl Reinecke. Consequently, Sveinbjörn gained a far higher level of musical education than other musicians in Iceland at that time.

Career
As the musical opportunities were limited in Iceland at the end of the 19th century, Sveinbjörn moved to Edinburgh. His composition pieces were mostly melody songs or poetical chamber music in the spirit of Mendelssohn. Sveinbjörn also composed a considerable number of folk songs.

Later life and death
In 1922, the Icelandic parliament, Althing, decided to grant him a pension, which allowed him to return to Iceland. He died in Copenhagen.

Recordings
 Sveinbjörn Sveinbjörnsson. Piano Trios / Violin Sonata in F major. Nina-Margret Grimsdottir, piano; Audur Hafsteinsdottir, violin; Sigurgeir Agnarsson, cello; Sigurður Bjarki Gunnarsson, cello. CD. Naxos 8.570460. Naxos, 2007. [Includes Idyl in A flat major, Vikivaki in B minor, Piano Trio in A minor, Lyric Pieces Nos. 1–4, Piano Trio in E minor, Violin Sonata in F major, Barcarolle in F major.]

Further reading
 Icelandic music history: Sveinbjörn Sveinbjörnsson

External links

 
 

1847 births
1927 deaths
Icelandic composers
Icelandic male musicians
National anthem writers